Toka is a French video game company founded by Carlo Perconti and Lyes Belaidouni, founders of Arcade Zone and later HyperDevbox Japan. Toka is the second company started by the duo. The company was among the first to use Motion Capture technology.

Works
 Adidas Power Soccer (PlayStation) 1995 
 Burning Road (PlayStation) 1996
 Explosive Racing (PlayStation) 1997
 Legend (PlayStation) 1998
 Extreme Snow Break (PlayStation) 1998 - 3D engine
 Soul Fighter (Dreamcast) 1999
 Sky Surfer (PlayStation 2) 2000
 Hidden Invasion (PlayStation 2) 2001
 The Flintstones in Viva Rock Vegas (PlayStation 2) 2001

References

External links
 Interview with the duo
 GDRI page

Defunct video game companies of France
Video game development companies